Alexis Marie Nucklos-Allen (born October 2, 1967), better known by her stage name Lexi Allen, is an American gospel singer, producer, actress, comedian, television personality, and screenwriter.

Early life
Alexis Marie Nucklos was born in Columbus, Ohio, where she grew up singing in her grandfather's church. Nucklos is daughter of physician Dr. Ruby Nucklos. She attended and graduated from Bowsher High School in Toledo. Nucklos later attended Bowling Green State University, where she majored in communications. During her freshman year in college, she was awarded the Ms. Bronze Pageant. In 1989, she became a member of Zeta Phi Beta.

Career
For a time she sang background vocals for, among others, Gerald LeVert, Vanessa Bell Armstrong and Fred Hammond. After the release of her debut album Call Her Lexi (1990) she stepped away from music, instead studying and working as a teacher, before renewing her singing career a decade later. Nucklos also married a music producer Michael Allen, who helped managed her musical career. During their marriage, Allen captured the attention of former boxing champion Evander Holyfield, who had set up the record label Real Deal Records. While signed onto Holyfield's label, Lexi released Lexi & That's the Way It Is (2002), A Praise in the Valley (2004) and What Heaven Hears (2005).

The 2004 album earned her a Stellar Gospel Music Award nomination. In 2006, Allen became the public face of The Word Network, where she presents the regular program "The Word Network Church with Lexi". She also hosted The Lexi Show, aired by The Word Network, on which she has interviewed such guests as B.Slade (then known as Tonex), Carlton Pearson, Shirley Caesar, DeWayne Woods and many others.

In 2010, The Lexi Show was suspended for nearly a year, soon after an interview in which Tonex spoke candidly about his same-sex attraction and his views on sexuality in general. The show returned in 2011, and later after a three-year hiatus, in 2015.

Her 2012 album Phenomenal was produced after she signed with Malaco Music Group. The singles "Burn It All Down" and "Abide" from this album hit the Billboard Hot Gospel Songs charts, peaking at #20 and #14 respectively.

Allen appears regularly on The Yolanda Adams Morning Show with the segment "Inside Inspiration with Lexi". On her YouTube channel, she has created comedy videos dealing with subjects such as church culture, African-American culture, and parodies of well-known TV shows. She also runs ALX Hair, a business selling hair extensions.

Personal life
Michael Dwayne Allen, her husband, was diagnosed with cancer and ultimately succumbed to the disease on October 5, 2004. Lexi has a son, Michael Alexander Osaze Allen, by her late husband Michael.

Discography

Albums
 Call Her Lexi (1990)
 Lexi & That's the Way It Is (2001) 
 Somewhere Different (2002) 
 A Praise in the Valley (2004) 
 What Heaven Hears (2005) 
 Phenomenal (2012)
 Just Listen (2018)

Filmography

Television
 The Word Network Church With Lexi (2006)
 The Lexi Show (2010-2011; 2015)

YouTube Shows
 Holy Ghost Enforcers (2012–present)
 Ghetto Bewitched (2015–present)

References

External links
 

1967 births
20th-century American businesspeople
20th-century American singers
20th-century American women singers
21st-century American actresses
21st-century American businesspeople
21st-century American businesswomen
21st-century American singers
21st-century American women singers
Actresses from Columbus, Ohio
African-American actresses
African-American women artists
African-American businesspeople
African-American Christians
20th-century African-American women singers
African-American television talk show hosts
American television talk show hosts
American gospel singers
American television journalists
American women television journalists
Bowling Green State University alumni
Comedy YouTubers
Living people
Musicians from Columbus, Ohio
Singers from Ohio
Songwriters from Ohio
African-American women in business
20th-century American businesswomen
African-American songwriters
21st-century African-American women singers
YouTubers from Ohio